The House of Representatives Majority and Minority Leaders (also called House of Representatives Floor Leaders) are the two members of the House of Representatives of the Philippines who are elected by their respective parties or coalitions as their official leaders. They serve as the chief spokesmen of their party with regard to their business in the Senate.

Current floor leaders 
The current majority floor leader is Martin Romualdez, of Lakas–CMD. The current minority leader is Marcelino "Nonoy" Libanan of the 4Ps party-list.

History 

The positions of Majority and Minority leaders of the House of Representatives of the Philippines are similarly alike to the United States House of Representatives's party leaders.

Majority floor leader 

The majority floor leader is elected among the members of the majority bloc, or those who voted for the Speaker. The majority floor leader asks as the spokesman of the majority bloc and directs deliberation on the plenary. He is also the chairman of the Committee on Rules.

Minority floor leader 

The minority floor leader is elected among the members of the minority bloc. Traditionally, the losing candidate in a two-way speakership election becomes the minority leader, but this was changed in the 17th Congress. The minority floor leader is the spokesman of the minority bloc, and is an ex officio member of all committees.

List

See also 

 Floor leaders of the Senate of the Philippines

References 

Majority leaders of the House of Representatives of the Philippines
Minority leaders of the House of Representatives of the Philippines
Political office-holders in the Philippines